Zeuzeropecten zambica is a species of moth of the family Cossidae. It is found in Malawi and Zambia.

References

Moths described in 2011
Zeuzerinae